Pan-European liberalism has been a political force since the establishment of the European Liberal Democrat and Reform Party in 1976.

Milestones
 15 December 2005
 Leaders and Prime Ministers' Meeting in Egmont Palace, Brussels.

 27 October 2005
 Prime ministers Meeting in Hampton Court.

 23–24 September 2005
 ELDR Congress hosted in Bratislava, hosted by ANO. Annemie Neyts-Uyttebroeck is elected as new ELDR president.

 22 September 2005
 50th Anniversary of the ELDR Council meeting in Bratislava.

 16 June 2005
 40 ELDR Leaders and Ministers met in the Palais Egmont on the eve of the European Council summit under the Luxembourg Presidency of the Council of the EU to discuss the political situation after the EU referendums in France and the Netherlands, as well as to discuss the EU Financial perspectives.

 14 May 2005
 ELDR Council was organised at the fringe of the Liberal International Congress in Sofia, hosted by NMSS and MRF. The Council discussed "Liberalism in a Multicultural reality", it adopted the new internal rules of the ELDR Party aisbl. Two new member parties joined the ELDR, Convergencia from Catalonia, Spain, and Civic Alliance from Serbia

 22 March 2005
 The ELDR Prime Ministers and Foreign Ministers and Party president Werner Hoyer met to discuss the EU's relaunch of the Lisbon strategy.

 18 October 2004
 ELDR Council met in the Bundestag in Berlin, hosted by FDP Leader Guido Westerwelle. Lex Corijn is re-elected unanimously as Secretary-general of the ELDR Party.

 July 2004
 Establishment of the ALDE political group by merger of the group of the ELDR Party with a group of MEPs from the newly established EDP Party, a splinter party from the EPP.

 17 June 2004
 Leaders and Ministers meeting in Palais Egmont, Brussels

 30 April 2004
 An Extraordinary congress was organised to create the ELDR Party aisbl, following the EU regulation 2004/2003, governing the statute and financing of European political parties. The ELDR Congress adopted the new statutes and elected three vice-presidents, Sharon Bowles, Liberal Democrats (United Kingdom), Androula Vassiliou, United Democrats (Cyprus) and Johannes Lebech, det radikale venstre (Denmark).

 29 April 2004
 About 1000 delegates from all ELDR member Parties from 22 countries attended the Electoral Rally "Freeing Europe's Potential" which was organised in the airport of Brussels to launch our top candidates and our ELDR European electoral campaign priorities.

 25 March 2004
PM meeting organised by ELDR and hosted in the official residence of PM Guy Verhofstadt.

 11–12 December 2003
 Liberal leaders and Ministers met in Val Duchesse, Brussels to discuss the draft European Constitution, ahead of the IGC. The meeting was preceded by a PM meeting which was attended by Mr Erdoğan, Prime Minister of Turkey

 12–14 November 2003
 European Liberal Democrats met in Amsterdam during the biggest ELDR Congress ever under the heading "Freeing Europe's Potential" in Amsterdam to adopt unanimously the Electoral Manifesto 2004. The ELDR Congress also elected Calin Tariceanu Popescu, from PNL Romania, Katarina Golev from ANO, Slovakia and Wilfried Derksen from D66, Netherlands, as ELDR Vice-Presidents. An urgency resolution was adopted by the ELDR Congress on the Constitutional Treaty.

 16 October 2003
 ELDR Prime Ministers and Liberal and Democrat leaders met at the fringe of the European Council summit, in the official residence of Guy Verhofstadt, to discuss mainly the IGC and European Council agenda, European Growth Initiative and European Defence.

 4 July 2003
 ELDR Council was held in London to discuss the final draft electoral manifesto 2004. The Council also welcomed three new political parties: Simeon II National Movement, from Bulgaria; the Liberals of Serbia and the Democratic Alliance Party from Albania

 19 June 2003
 34 Liberal and Democrat leaders meet in Thessaloniki, before the European Council summit held under Greek Presidency of the Council of the EU – the last summit to be held outside of Brussels. They welcomed the draft Constitutional Treaty as agreed by the European Convention.

 25 October 2002
 An ELDR Prime Ministers meeting was hosted by Belgian Prime Minister Guy Verhofstadt.

 18 October 2002
 Under the title "Freedom for Growth", the ELDR Congress was organised in Bath, hosted by the Liberal Democrats. Three new vice-presidents were elected Androula Vassiliou, United Democrats from Cyprus, Alan Beith, Liberal Democrats, from United Kingdom and Johannes Lebech, det radikale venstre, Denmark. Under the ELWN leadership of Maria Kaisa Aula (keskusta, Finland), a gender equality and multicultural approach policy paper was adopted by the Congress.

 1 July 2002
 Liberal Prime Minister of Denmark, Anders Fogh Rasmussen inaugurates the semester of Danish Presidency of the Council of the EU. With Pat Cox as speaker of the European Parliament and Romano Prodi as President of the European Commission, the European Liberal Democrats now chair the three most important decision-making institutions of the EU.

 20 June 2002
 Despite a difficult domestic political climate at the time and two major general strikes, 35 Liberal and Democrat Leaders and Ministers met in Seville, at the eve of the European Council summit under Spanish Presidency of the Council of the EU. The meeting proved to be very successful.

 4 April 2002
 The Movement of Free Citizens (KEP) from Greece and ANO from Slovakia become full members of the ELDR Party. The European liberal family now brings together 49 political parties from the EU member states and candidate countries.

 16 January 2002
 Pat Cox, president of the ELDR Group, becomes the new President of the European Parliament. Graham Watson (UK) becomes the new leader of the ELDR Group in the European Parliament.

 13 December 2001
 An ELDR Leaders and Ministers meeting was held in Palais Egmont to discuss the agenda of the European Council.

 December 2001
 Four Parties from Croatia (Croatia People's Party), Bulgaria (Movement for Rights and Freedoms), Czech Republic (ODA) and Lithuania (New Union) become full members of the ELDR Party.

 25–28 September 2001
 The annual Autumn Congress 2001 is held in Ljubljana, Slovenia. The ELDR becomes the first European political party to organise its annual congress in an accession country. Rinnovamento Italiano becomes a full member of the ELDR Party.
 A new Bureau is elected. Dr Werner Hoyer is unanimously re-elected to the position of President of the ELDR Party with Maria Kaisa Aula, Lamberto Dini, Bas Eenhoorn and John Alderdice being elected as Vice-Presidents. Jules Maaten also unanimously re-elected as party Treasurer.
 Ljubljana Congress laid out the foundations for the work of the Electoral Manifesto 2004 under the chairmanship of Hans van Baalen, MP, VVD, Netherlands. It also laid the foundation of E-membership to the ELDR Party.

 15 September 2001
 ELDR launched its first quarterly newspaper edition "Insight", following the 25th anniversary of ELDR, highlighting ELDR's key mission to reunite Europe and strengthen our family

 14 June 2001
 Leaders and ministers met at the eve of the European Council summit in Gothenburg, under the Swedish Presidency of the Council of the EU in the National Opera.

 6–8 June 2001
 25th anniversary of the adoption of the Stuttgart Declaration and the creation of the first European Political family, ELD. During the Council meeting the Liberal Party of Gibraltar, the United Democrats of Cyprus and the Liberal Party of Andorra, became full members of the ELDR Party. The New Democracy of Serbia became an affiliate member.

 March 2001
 The Liberal Party of Greece is warmly welcomed as a full member whilst the Liberal Party of Macedonia becomes an affiliate member.

 December 2000
 "I democratici" from Italy become full Member of the ELDR Party

 October 2000
 Congress in Tenerife under the title " The Enlargement of a Reformed Union an Historical Imperative". Dr Werner Hoyer is elected as new ELDR president.
 The Lithuanian Liberal Union, and Lista Di Pietro from Italy become full members of the ELDR. It was also decided that the Bureau would be charged to actively strengthen the contacts with "I Democratici" later this year, in light of their upcoming decision on international alignment.
 The newly formed Liberal Democratic Party of Bosnia-Herzegovina replaces the Liberal Party of Bosnia-Herzegovina, following a recent name change and a merger with another party. Venstre from Norway is granted affiliate membership.

 April 2000
 Lex Corijn is elected new Secretary general of the ELDR Party. Centre Party of Sweden and Latvia's Way become full members.
 The President states that the affiliate membership of the Liberal Democratic Party of Macedonia is still valid in spite of its recent split.

 September 1999
 Christian Ehlers, Secretary general of the Party ends his mandate.

 June 1999
 Fifth direct elections. 11% of vote and 51 seats secured.

 April 1999
 The National Liberal Party of Romania (PNL) becomes a full member. The Liberal Democratic Union of Bulgaria (LDU) becomes an affiliate member. The Democratic Alliance Party of Albania (DA) joins ELDR as an affiliate member. The Liberal Party of Kosovo becomes a full member as a sign of support and solidarity.
 Congress in Berlin under the title of "Making the Difference. Unity in Freedom: the liberal challenge for Europe".

 December 1998
 The Estonian Reform Party becomes full member.

 June 1998
 The Liberal Democracy of Slovenia (LDS) becomes full member. The Liberal Party of Croatia (HSLS) becomes affiliate member.

 December 1997
 The FDP Switzerland becomes full member after being affiliate to the Party since October 1993. The Liberal Party of Italy joins the ELDR Party as a full member. Latvia's Way and the Lithuanian Liberal Union join as affiliate members.

 September 1997
 Liberal Party of Bosnia-Hercegovina becomes full member. The Lithuanian Centre Union and the National Party of Romania become affiliate members. The Liberal Party of Macedonia merges with the Democratic Party of Macedonia and joins as affiliate under the name of Liberal Democratic Party of Macedonia.

 April 1997
 Two affiliate members become full members: SzDSz of Hungary and MPP-MOS of Slovakia. The Coexistence Movement of Slovakia becomes affiliate member.

 December 1996
 United Democrats of Cyprus join as affiliate member.

 November 1996
 PSD (Portugal) leaves the ELDR Party and ELDR Group.

 September 1996
 Democratic Party of Cyprus – DIKO is accepted as affiliate member.

 July 1996
 Liberal Party of Kosovo is accepted as affiliate member. Congress in Vienna.

 March 1996
 Liberal Party of Andorra is accepted as affiliate member. Membership of FORO (Spain) ends.

 December 1995
 Reform Party of Estonia is accepted as affiliate member.

 July 1995
 Congress in Stockholm. Election of Uffe Ellemann-Jensen (Venstre, DK) as new President of the ELDR Party.

 March 1995
 Democratic Union of Slovakia becomes affiliate member.

 December 1994
 Parti républicain asked to withdraw. D'66 (Netherlands) and FdLi (Italy) join. Svobodni Demokrati, SD-OH (Czech Republic) becomes affiliate member.

 June 1994
 Fourth direct elections – 43 out of increased total of 567 seats.

 March 1994
 Liberal Party of Bosnia-Herzegovina and Croatian Social Liberal Party (HSLS) become affiliate members.

 December 1993
 New Spanish party, FORO joins. Liberales Forum (Austria) becomes an affiliate member. Congress in Torquay. ELDR becomes a European political party as the "European Liberal Democrat and Reform Party".

 October 1993
 Liberal Party of Macedonia, Liberal Party of Finland and FDP-PRD Switzerland become affiliate members.

 April 1993
 PVV (Belgium) rejoins as VLD

 October 1992
 Hungarian Civic Party (Slovakia) becomes an Affiliate Member.

 July 1992
 Congress in Copenhagen.SzDSz (Hungary), Swedish People's Party of Finland and Liberal Democratic Party of Slovenia become affiliate members.

 March 1992
 Centre Party of Finland becomes an affiliate member.

 February 1992
 Det Radikale Venstre rejoins. FIDESZ (Hungary) becomes an affiliate member.

 June 1991
 Congress in Poitiers. Executive Committee becomes a Council with a more flexible structure. Affiliate & Observer member status created. Swedish Liberal party becomes an affiliate member.

 Mar. 1991
 Christian Ehlers appointed Secretary General, replacing Mario David who becomes Deputy Secretary General of the LDR Group.

 June 1990
 Congress in Shannon. Guests from Central and eastern Europe. Colette Flesch is succeeded by Willy de Clercq as president. Mario David becomes Secretary General.

 July 1989
 CDS (Spain) joins.

 June 1989
 Third direct elections – 10% of vote and 49 seats secured.

 December 1988
 Congress in Luxembourg.

 November 1988
 Liberal Democrats (UK) joins

 May 1988
 Progressive Democrats (Republic of Ireland) joins.

 April 1987
 Congress in Lisbon.

 June 1986
 New logo adopted.

 April 1986
 Congress in Catania. Federation changes its name to "Federation of Liberal Democratic and Reform Parties – ELDR". Statutes are changed to allow for three vice-presidents.

 February 1986
 PSD (Portugal) joins

 December 1985
 PRD (Spain) joins.

 June 1985
 Congress in Groningen, Colette Flesch elected president.

 February 1985
 Mechtild Von Alemann becomes Secretary General.

 June 1984
 Second direct elections. 31 seats and 9.7% of votes secured.

 December 1983
 Congress in Munich. Liberal Party of Greece joins the Federation.

 October 1982
 Jens Nymand Christensen becomes Secretary General.

 May 1982
 Congress in Venice.

 June 1981
 Congress in Copenhagen. Willy de Clercq elected as president.

 February 1980
 Congress in Paris.

 June 1979
 In the first direct election to the European Parliament ELD candidates secure 14% of the vote and 39 of the 410 seats.

 April 1979
 1,200 Liberal politicians attend ELD Election rally.

 December 1978
 Congress in London – Gaston Thorn confirmed as president.

 November 1977
 Political programme adopted by congress in Brussels.

 July 1977
 "European Liberal Democrats" Title chosen for first elections.

 December 1976
 Florus Wijsenbeek appointed as first Secretary General.

 November 1976
 First Electoral Congress, The Hague. Draft political programme adopted by newly elected, 12 member executive committee.

 March 1976
 Federation of Liberal and Democratic Parties in the European Community established. Stuttgart Declaration is adopted. Preparation of draft political programmes commences.

 1972
 Liberal Leaders' meetings commenced.

 April 1947
 Foundation of "International World Union" (Liberal International).

History of the European Union
History of liberalism
History of political thought
Pan-Europeanism